Azubuike Emanuel Egwuekwe (born 16 July 1989) is a Nigerian professional footballer who plays for Rivers United as a centre back.

Club career
Born in Lafia, Egwuekwe has played club football for Nasarawa United, Yerima Strikers, Warri Wolves, KuPS and SuperSport United.

After a year at Libyan club Al-Nasr Benghazi, Egwuekwe returned to Nigeria and joined Rivers United in September 2019.

International career
He made his international debut for Nigeria in 2012, and has appeared in FIFA World Cup qualifying matches. He was called up to Nigeria's 23-man squad for the 2013 Africa Cup of Nations. He was also selected for Nigeria's squad at the 2013 FIFA Confederations Cup, and the 2014 African Nations Championship.

References

1989 births
Living people
People from Lafia
Nigerian footballers
Nigeria international footballers
Warri Wolves F.C. players
Nasarawa United F.C. players
Kuopion Palloseura players
SuperSport United F.C. players
Al-Nasr SC (Benghazi) players
Rivers United F.C. players
Veikkausliiga players
South African Premier Division players
Association football central defenders
Nigerian expatriate footballers
Nigerian expatriate sportspeople in Finland
Expatriate footballers in Finland
Nigerian expatriate sportspeople in South Africa
Expatriate soccer players in South Africa
Nigerian expatriate sportspeople in Libya
Expatriate footballers in Libya
2013 Africa Cup of Nations players
2013 FIFA Confederations Cup players
2014 FIFA World Cup players
Africa Cup of Nations-winning players
Libyan Premier League players
Nigeria A' international footballers
2014 African Nations Championship players